USS Leyte may refer to:

, was a Spanish gunboat built in 1887 and captured during the Spanish–American War
, was a repair ship commissioned August 1944 and renamed Maui in May 1945
, was an aircraft carrier commissioned in 1946 and decommissioned in 1959

See also
, is a guided missile cruiser launched in 1986 and currently in active service

United States Navy ship names